Batuceper is a district of Tangerang City, Banten, Indonesia. 

It formed part of the particuliere land, or private domain, of Luitenant der Chinezen Tan Tiang Po and his son, Tan Liok Tiauw Sia, Landheeren or landlords of Batoe-Tjepper.

References

Tangerang
Districts of Banten